The 2016 NWSL College Draft was the fourth annual meeting of National Women's Soccer League (NWSL) franchises to select eligible college players. It was held on January 15, 2016 at the National Soccer Coaches Association of America Convention in Baltimore, Maryland.

Format
Draft order was determined by the final 2015 regular season standings.

Results

Key

Picks

Trades
Round 1:

Round 2:

Round 3:

Round 4:

Summary
In 2016, a total of 27 colleges had players selected. Of these, 13 had a player drafted to the NWSL for the first time: Arizona State, Arkansas, Cal State Fullerton, California, DePaul, Hofstra, LSU, Northern Colorado, Rutgers, San Francisco, St. John's, Texas and Utah.

Schools with multiple draft selections

Selections by college athletic conference

Selections by position

See also
 List of NWSL drafts
 List of National Women's Soccer League draftees by college team
 2016 National Women's Soccer League season

References

External links 
 NWSL Live Stream 2016 College Draft

National Women's Soccer League drafts
College Draft
NWSL College Draft
2010s in Baltimore
Soccer in Baltimore
Events in Baltimore
NWSL College Draft